The list of ship decommissionings in 2006 includes a chronological list of all ships decommissioned in 2006.


See also 

2006
 Ship decommissionings
Ship